Alexia Paganini (born November 15, 2001) is a Swiss-American figure skater who currently represents Switzerland in ladies' singles. She is the 2020 CS Nebelhorn Trophy silver medalist, the 2018 Halloween Cup champion, the 2017 Slovenia Open champion, and a four-time Swiss national champion (2017–2019, 2021).

Paganini represented Switzerland at the 2018 and 2022 Winter Olympics, finishing twenty-first and twenty-second, respectively.

Personal life 
Alexia Paganini was born on November 15, 2001, in Greenwich, Connecticut, United States. The second of three children, she has two brothers – Kevin and Mario. She holds Swiss and U.S. citizenship. Her father, Celso Paganini, is from Brusio, Switzerland. Her mother, originally from the Netherlands, lived for ten years in St. Moritz, Switzerland.

Career

Early career 
Paganini began learning to skate in 2003. She skated at Westchester Skating Academy for a few years under her former coach, Gilberto Viadana. She represented the United States at two international events. In April 2016, she won the junior gold medal at the Gardena Spring Trophy in Italy. In August 2016, she finished sixth at an ISU Junior Grand Prix event in France.

In January 2017, Paganini placed fifth on the junior level at the U.S. Championships. Later that year, she became interested in competing for Switzerland after a suggestion by her coach, Igor Krokavec. Swiss Ice Skating became aware of her interest in April 2017 and soon contacted her.

2017–2018 season: PyeongChang Olympics 
Paganini made her senior international debut and her first appearance for Switzerland at the Slovenia Open in August 2017; she outscored Australia's Kailani Craine by 2.31 points to win the gold medal. In late September, she competed at the 2017 CS Nebelhorn Trophy, the final qualifying opportunity for the 2018 Winter Olympics. Ranked sixth in the short program and third in the free skate, she obtained the bronze medal (by a margin of 0.13 over Germany's Nathalie Weinzierl) in addition to a spot for Switzerland at the Olympics. In December, the Swiss Olympic Association confirmed that Paganini would represent Switzerland at the Olympics.

In January, Paganini finished seventh at the 2018 European Championships in Moscow, Russia. The following month, she competed at the 2018 Winter Olympics in PyeongChang, South Korea. Ranked nineteenth in the short program, she advanced to the final segment and would finish twenty-first overall. She also qualified to the free skate at the 2018 World Championships, finishing twentieth at the March event in Milan, Italy.

2018–2019 season: Grand Prix debut 
Alexia Paganini began her season with an eighth-place at the CS Autumn Classic. In October, she won the International Halloween Cup after placing second in the short program behind Ivett Tóth but first in the free.

Paganini made her Grand Prix debut at the 2018 Rostelecom Cup. In the short program, she scored a personal best (63.43) and was in third place. In the free skate, she marked her personal best (119.07), and she placed fifth, to finish fourth overall with a total of 182.50 (her personal best score), behind Alina Zagitova, Sofia Samodurova, and Lim Eun-soo. Due to Carolina Kostner's withdrawal from the 2018 Internationaux de France because of injury, Paganini was chosen to replace her at the event, giving her a second Grand Prix assignment. She was eighth after the short program, tenth in the free, and finished tenth overall. In December, she won the Swiss Championships for the second time in a row.

In January 2019, she competed at the European Championships, held in Minsk, Belarus. Paganini scored a new personal best in the short program, 65.64, and won the bronze small medal behind Zagitova and Samodurova.  She said she was "really happy with my performance. I actually was nervous but tried not to show it." Paganini placed seventh in the free skate and finished sixth overall.  She concluded the season at the 2019 World Championships, where she made multiple errors in the short program and placed thirty-third, failing to qualify for the free skate.

2019–2020 season 
Paganini began the season with a sixth place at the 2019 CS Autumn Classic International.  At her first Grand Prix, the 2019 Skate Canada International, she placed ninth.  She was seventh at the 2019 Rostelecom Cup. In December, she won her third straight Swiss national title and was named to the Swiss team for the European Championships. In January, she placed fourth at the championships. She was also named to the Swiss 2020 Worlds team, but the competition was canceled due to the coronavirus pandemic.
 
In June, she announced she was changing coaches to train with Stéphane Lambiel in Champéry. Paganini subsequently attributed the switch to the effects of the pandemic in the United States and her desire for "a change and for everything to be a bit more professional and organized."

2020–2021 season 
With pandemic-related travel restrictions in place, Paganini began the season at the 2020 CS Nebelhorn Trophy, an event attended only by ladies training in Europe. She was the top-ranked competitor attending and was pegged as the pre-event favorite. Paganini led after the short program but fell twice in the free and cut her right hand on the blade of her skate, placing third in that segment and second overall.

Paganini was assigned to compete at the 2020 Internationaux de France, but the event was cancelled due to the pandemic.

At the 2021 World Championships in Stockholm, Paganini placed twenty-fifth in the short program after popping a planned triple loop into an invalid double and narrowly missed advancing to the free skate.

On June 11, 2021, Paganini announced on social media that she'd discontinued training under Stéphane Lambiel in Champéry and relocated her training base to Zürich to train with Gheorghe Chiper and his coaching team.

2021–2022 season: Beijing Olympics 
Paganini began the season at the 2021 CS Lombardia Trophy, where she placed second in the short program but dropped to fourth place after the free skate. She next competed at the 2021 CS Nebelhorn Trophy, seeking to qualify a berth for Switzerland at the 2022 Winter Olympics after failing to do so at the World Championships. She was second in the short program and fifth in the free skate, placing fourth overall and taking the fourth of six available spots.

Paganini was originally scheduled to compete at 2021 Skate Canada International but later withdrew. She won her fourth Swiss national title in November. Beginning the new year at the 2022 European Championships in Tallinn, Paganini was tenth.

Assigned to her second Swiss Olympic team, Paganini placed nineteenth in the short program of the women's event, qualifying to the free skate. Both parts of her jump combination were called underrotated. She was twenty-second in the free skate and finished twenty-second overall. After on Instagram, Paganini said she was "incredibly grateful" to have been a two-time Olympian. Paganini concluded the season with a nineteenth place at the 2022 World Championships, expressing satisfaction with the result after having come down with the flu in the week beforehand.

2022–2023 season 
Paganini began the season finishing fifth at the 2022 CS Finlandia Trophy. She placed fifth in the short program at the 2022 CS Budapest Trophy but withdrew before the free skate, citing medical reasons. In her lone Grand Prix appearance, she came ninth at the 2022 MK John Wilson Trophy.

Programs

Competitive highlights 
GP: Grand Prix; CS: Challenger Series; JGP: Junior Grand Prix

For Switzerland

For the United States

Detailed results

Senior level

Small medals for short and free programs awarded only at ISU Championships. Personal bests highlighted in bold, season bests in italic.

References

External links 
 

2001 births
Living people
People from Greenwich, Connecticut
Swiss female single skaters
American female single skaters
Swiss people of Dutch descent
American people of Dutch descent
American people of Swiss descent
Figure skaters at the 2018 Winter Olympics
Figure skaters at the 2022 Winter Olympics
Olympic figure skaters of Switzerland
21st-century American women